Lummi sticks, named after the Lummi Native American peoples, are hardwood cylindrical sticks, usually roughly 7 inches long and 0.75 inches in diameter, used as percussive musical instruments. They are generally struck against one another, and used frequently in musical education to teach rhythm.

Another variety, called simply a rhythm stick, is 12 inches long and painted blue. These are generally either cylindrical or fluted, and come in sets containing an equal number of both.

The sticks are used in elementary school education in the US and Canada.

A similar stick game is the Ti Rakau of the Māori people, played with meter-long sticks.

See also
 Claves

References

American Indian musical instruments
North American percussion instruments